Cervecería 100 Montaditos is a restaurant chain in Spain specializing in sandwiches. The chain had over 350 retail stores in Spain. It has more than 90 restaurants in foreign countries: 34 in Italy, 20 in Portugal, 13 in Mexico, 5 in the United States, 3 in Guatemala, 2 in Colombia, 2 in Chile, 1 in Costa Rica, 1 in the Dominican Republic, 1 in Paraguay, 1 in Ecuador, 1 in Panama.

Origin of the name
The term refers to an ancient Spanish culinary habit of filling one or two small slices of bread with various ingredients such as cold cuts, meat, fish, vegetables, cheeses or various types of sauces.

100 Montaditos has thus decided to take inspiration from this tradition by giving life to a list of a hundred different proposals.

From the historical ones with jamón serrano or tortilla de patatas, to those designed specifically for the local market, up to the sweet ones.

History
The first 100 Montaditos restaurant was opened in Spain in 2000 on a small beach in Islantilla, Huelva, by the hand of the Seville entrepreneur Jose María Capitán .

In subsequent years, they opened an average of twenty rooms per year, eventually exceeding more than 200 restaurants in Spain at the beginning of 2012.

In 2010, they opened their first restaurant outside of Spain, in the United States.

In 2012, Cervecería 100 Montaditos reached Latin America.

On March 6, 2015, Cervecerìa 100 Montaditos filed for bankruptcy in the U.S.

In November 2015, the company, already with a solid presence in Italy, opened a second restaurant with the aim of making it the most important in the foreign market. Here, the Spanish word "Cervecería" (which literally means "Brewery") has been omitted, keeping only the name 100 Montaditos.

References

External links

Restaurants in Spain
Restaurants established in 2000
Fast-food franchises
Multinational companies headquartered in Spain
2000 establishments in Spain
Companies that filed for Chapter 11 bankruptcy in 2015